Hadebe is a surname originally found in South Africa. 
The surname is closely related to Radebe, with some using the surnames interchangeably.
Notable people with the surname include:

Edward Hadebe (born 1987), South African footballer
Monde Hadebe (born 1990), South African rugby union player
Siyabonga Radebe', South African Entertainer/Actor..

Bantu-language surnames